Moira is the first extended play (EP) by Filipina singer Moira Dela Torre. The EP is self-titled and consists of six tracks, all songs were originally written by Moira Dela Torre herself.

Background
After joining the first season of The Voice of the Philippines, Dela Torre has kept her music career on track by working on corporate jingles and theme songs: including McDonald's "Hooray for Today", Surf's "Pinalaki", and Johnson & Johnson's "Signature of Love". In 2014, Dela Torre caught the attention of Ivory Music and offered her a recording contract for her self-titled debut EP, Moira.

Track listing
6 songs were written by Dela Torre.

References

External links

2014 debut EPs
Moira Dela Torre albums